Saud Sammar Al-Otaibi is a former Saudi Arabian football goalkeeper who played for Saudi Arabia in the 1992 Asian Cup. He also played for Al Shabab.

External links

1969 births
1992 King Fahd Cup players
1992 AFC Asian Cup players
Afif FC players
Al-Shabab FC (Riyadh) players
Ittihad FC players
Living people
Saudi Arabian footballers
Saudi Arabia international footballers
Place of birth missing (living people)
Association football goalkeepers